Chang Erawan station is a BTS Skytrain station, on the Sukhumvit Line in Samut Prakan Province, Thailand.

It opened on 6 December 2018 as part of the 13 km eastern extension. Rides on the extension were free until April 16, 2019. The station is near with Erawan Museum on Sukhumvit Road.

References

See also
 Bangkok Skytrain

BTS Skytrain stations
Railway stations opened in 2018